WTPG is a Christian radio station licensed to Whitehouse, Ohio, broadcasting on 88.9 MHz FM. WTPG is owned by Taylor University Broadcasting, Inc.

Until November 1, 2019, WTPG was an affiliate of the KRTM Radio Network. After this date, it switched to relaying WBCL's satellite feed.

References

External links
WBCL website

TPG
TPG
Contemporary Christian radio stations in the United States
Radio stations established in 2011
2011 establishments in Ohio